The Panasonic Lumix DMC-FZ5 is a superzoom bridge digital camera. It is featured with a black or silver model and was released by Panasonic in February 2005.

Like its predecessors the 2-megapixel FZ1 and FZ2, it has its 12x optical zoom-lens designed by Leica, with the 35 mm equivalents being 36–432. In which, it has the improved optical image stabilization system (Mega O.I.S) and the Venus II engine, which helps process its images faster, after a shooting.

Likewise, because of its functions, it is as though the FZ20 has come down to size. The only functions that the FZ5 does not include is its manual focus ring, flash hotshoe, and ED lens-element.

Although the FZ20's lens also has frozen aperture at f/2.8 through the full zoom-range, the DMC-FZ5's is at 2.8–3.3, a relatively minor difference.

The FZ5 has since been replaced by the FZ7.

References
http://www.dpreview.com/articles/5667899016/panasonicfz4fz5
http://www.dpreview.com/products/panasonic/compacts/panasonic_dmcfz5/specifications

External links 

Bridge digital cameras
Superzoom cameras
FZ5
Live-preview digital cameras